The 60th Massachusetts General Court, consisting of the Massachusetts Senate and the Massachusetts House of Representatives, met in 1839 during the governorship of Edward Everett. Myron Lawrence served as president of the Senate and Robert Charles Winthrop served as speaker of the House.

On March 9, "72 women, citizens of Boston, petitioned the Legislature for a repeal" of laws banning interracial marriage.

At the time, members required a majority of the popular vote to be declared elected. If no winner was chosen, the General Court voted to resolve the election, usually in favor of whichever party held the majority of seats in the General Court.

Senators

Representatives

See also
 1839 Massachusetts gubernatorial election
 26th United States Congress
 List of Massachusetts General Courts

References

External links
 
 

Political history of Massachusetts
Massachusetts legislative sessions
massachusetts
1839 in Massachusetts